Maurice Dupré, PC (March 20, 1888 – October 3, 1941) was a Canadian politician.

Born in Lévis, Quebec, he first ran unsuccessfully for the House of Commons of Canada representing the Quebec riding of Kamouraska in the 1925 federal election. A Conservative, he was elected in the 1930 federal election representing the riding of Quebec West. He was defeated in 1935 and again in 1940. From 1930 to 1935, he was the Solicitor General of Canada.

References
 
 Maurice Dupré fonds, Library and Archives Canada

1888 births
1941 deaths
Conservative Party of Canada (1867–1942) MPs
Members of the House of Commons of Canada from Quebec
Members of the King's Privy Council for Canada
Solicitors General of Canada